Guibert is a given name and surname, and may refer to:

 Given name
Guibert of Ravenna (or Wibert of Ravenna; c. 1029–1100), Italian Roman Catholic archbishop of Ravenna, elected Antipope Clement III
Guibert of Gembloux (10th century), founder of the Abbey of Gembloux
Guibert of Nogent (c. 1055–1124), Benedictine author and theologian
Guibert of Tournai (13th century), Franciscan theologian
Maistre Guibert Kaukesel, or Hubert Chaucesel (fl. c. 1230–55), French trouvère from Arras
Guibert of Cors (died 1258), French knight and Baron of Mitopoli in the Principality of Achaea

 Surname
André Guibert (1886-1966), French psychiatrist and psychoanalyst
Andres Guibert (born 1968), Cuban basketball player
Élisabeth Guibert (1725–1788), French writer
Georges Guibert (1915–1997), French Roman Catholic missionary in Senegal and Réunion
Hervé Guibert (1955-1991), French author
Jacques-Antoine-Hippolyte de Guibert (1743–1790), French soldier, civil-military theorist
Joseph-Hippolyte Guibert (1802–1886), French archbishop
Maurice Guibert (1856–1913), French photographer, friend of Henri de Toulouse-Lautrec
Nicolas Guibert (c. 1547 – c. 1620), French critic of alchemy
Rita Guibert (1916-2007), American author, journalist and translator

Other uses 
33335 Guibert, a minor planet discovered on 11 November 1998 at ODAS
Mont-Saint-Guibert, a Walloon municipality located in the Belgian province of Walloon Brabant.